ESPN Sports Saturday was an American sports anthology television program that was broadcast on the American Broadcasting Company (ABC). Produced by sister cable sports network ESPN, it premiered on April 3, 2010. The two-hour program regularly aired on Saturdays at 4:00 p.m. Eastern Time between mid-January and late August (due to the network's college football coverage during the fall) to fill time on weeks when ABC did not air any afternoon sports programming. However, it has since become the ABC simulcast of the ESPN 30 for 30 specials that now air during the Saturday afternoon timeslot on ABC thus officially ending the anthology show.

The program featured a hosting segment, originally by Hannah Storm and later various anchors featured on ESPN's flagship program, SportsCenter. It was ultimately dropped in August 2015 due to a change in format thus officially making ESPN Sports Saturday obsolete (sans for its 30 for 30 airings).

ESPN, which like ABC is owned by The Walt Disney Company, has handled ABC's sports coverage since 2006 under the ESPN on ABC umbrella, and ESPN Sports Saturday could be considered a descendant of ABC's Wide World of Sports.

Content on the series initially included "Winners Bracket", a segment consisting of highlights, as well as specials sourced from other ESPN documentary programs, including Homecoming with Rick Reilly, 30 for 30 and E:60.  Upon the show's return after the 2010 college football season, the "Winners Bracket" hour of the block was later replaced by a new weekly discussion series that showcased the best of the ESPN sports discussion shows including new exclusive content on the upcoming week's major sporting events. The program was eventually cancelled after 5 seasons in August 2015. This was because ABC gave back the Sunday afternoon schedule to its affiliates 4 months later. Also, with the rise of the Internet and 24/7 mobile applications and streaming services specializing in sports news have completely eliminated the need for a traditional anthology sports program airing on broadcast television (including ABC) during weekend afternoons. It also eliminated the need for a separate Sunday afternoon block on ABC which had seen a long decline until January 2016. It is now simply a simulcast of the 30 for 30 documentary series sourced from ESPN.

See also
 Wide World of Sports
 CBS Sports Spectacular

References

American Broadcasting Company original programming
ABC Sports
2010s American anthology television series
Sports telecast series
2010 American television series debuts